A Curate in Bohemia is a 1972 Australian TV play based on a 1913 novel by Norman Lindsay. It was one of a series of adaptations of Lindsay works on the ABC in 1972.

Plot
A man considering entering the priesthood falls in with some artists.

Production
Series producer Alan Burke said "A Curate in Bohemia, written when Lindsay was a very young man, is like a Marx Brothers knockabout farce. And we played it like that.

Cast
Bryan Davies		
Reg Livermore
Ray Gurney

References

External links
 
 A Curate in Bohemia at AustLit
 Complete copy of script at National Archives of Australia

Australian television plays
Films directed by Alan Burke (director)
Films based on works by Norman Lindsay